Sabellmay refer to:
 Sabella (surname), a name of Italian origin
 Sabella (polychaete), a genus of marine polychaete worms